= Wartberg (Fichtel Mountains) =

Mountain in Germany

Coordinates: 50°03′41″N 12°07′07″E

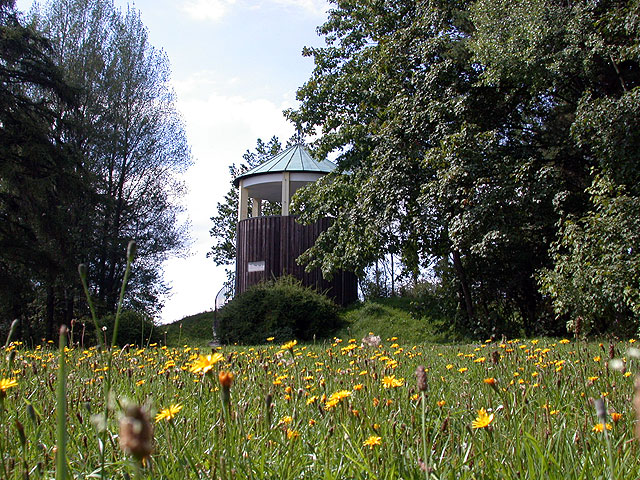
- The lookout tower on the Wartberg.

Highest point
- Elevation: 628 m (2,060 ft)

Geography
- Location: Bavaria, Germany

Wartberg is a mountain of Bavaria, Germany.
